Grabovica is a village in the municipality of Gornji Milanovac, Serbia. The name derivates from the word grab ("hornbeam"). According to the 2011 census, the village had a population of 456 people.

Geography, climate and ecosystem
Grabovica is located 6 km from Gornji Milanovac. This village is dispersed settlement Rural type.

Main hamlets (or official they are called Cadastral community) in the village are: 
Arnautići (meaning: Place of Inhabitants from Old Serbia territory), 
Čokanja (meaning: Hill), 
Parac (meaning: Nearness by town), 
Rapaj Brdo (meaning: Turnip tump ) and 
Votnjaci (meaning: Orchards).

Highest peaks in Grabovica are: Klik 721 m (2,365 ft), Veliki Vrh 691 m (2,267 ft), Mali Vrh 623 m (2,044 ft) and Parac 602 m (1975 ft).

Grabovica, like Gornji Milanovac has Humid continental climate. The hottest months of the year are July and August, while the coldest are January and February. The average annual precipitation height are in the range of 788 mm (31.02 in). The most precipitation falls in period April–June and the least in October–February. Average snow cover stays for period of 160–190 days. Minimum mean wind speed is 1.7–2.6 m/s (3.11–5.05 knots) and maximum 13.8–20.7 m/s (26.83–40.24 knots). The maximum speed occurs here with southeastern, southwestern and southern winds. Annual average daily global sun radiation energy on a horizontal surface of municipality Gornji Milanovac is between 3.8–4.0 kWh/m (0.33-0.35 BTU/ft). Average recorded emission of CO2 is 0.52 tons. Relative humidity is 85% average in winter periods and 78.5 average in summer periods.

In this village there are various water resources. As proof of that, there are numerous water wells. Soil on its territory is in majority of brown earth on diabase. Vegetation period lasts 220–260 days.  Forest vegetation makes 2/3 of total area and contains hornbeam, pilar, oak, acacia, etc. Plant vegetation consists of meadow grass (in majority), meadows and grassland. As for November 2015 and changes of the settlements territory boundaries of this village through this village circulate smaller Grabovica river and to a lesser part on the north of the territory, rivers: Glogovac and Gruža.

History

There are several sites in Grabovica from the Roman and Byzantine eras. There are Roman archaeological sites in the hamlet of Arnauti-Kršić, some "Hungarian" sites (as local people calls them), and a church from the period of Austrian occupation of Serbia (1718-1739) in Parac. Radič Postupović (1413–1441), the senior aristocrat of the Serbian Despotate, founded the Monastery of the Great Annunciation (Veliko Blagoveštenje) in the village of Grabovica, sometime before 1429–30. These monuments were demolished when the area underwent colonisation. In 1718 there were no households in Grabovica. According to Dr Milenko S. Filipović larger settlements begun from the period 1718–1739. In 1735 there was 15 households. The inhabitants were mainly settled from the Ottoman regions of Bosnia and Herzegovina, Montenegro and southwestern Serbia. The village saw an industrial progress in the 60's through the 90's breakup of Yugoslavia. In the period 1961, Grabovica had biggest population of 897 citizen. In that period (1955-1999) major immigration came from Montenegro, Croatia, Kosovo and Metohija and some parts of Raška region. Decreasing trend of population number happened in period 1971–2002, shows census data  Also, Grabovica had a public owned Agricultural cooperative in the period from '40s to the late '70s. They were specialized for redemption of wool, cereals, milk, eggs, crops, fruits and vegetables. Their head office were in place of today Cultural, Administration, Information and Assembly Center (CAIAC) of the settlement Grabovica. At the beginning of the '80s Grabovica Agriculture Cooperation merged with other Gornji Milanovac agriculture enterprises and function as member and partner of Gornji Milanovac big PIK "Takovo" (today "Swisslion Takovo" Concern) and other food industry across former Yugoslavia.

Demographics
There are 148 households in this village and the number decreases, because of a bad economic situation. According to the date from 2011 census, in this village population by nationality is:
 Serbs- 455
 Unknown- 1

As regard as mother language, population is distributed in the next way:
  Serbian language - 453
  Croatian language- 1
   Unknown- 2

In the village Grabovica, structure of the population by age and sex is what it follows:

Sports
During winter times on Ždreban peak, recreational skiers and other athletes use some paths for their exercises. Grabovica has 2 ball open parks for recreation purpose:3x3 Basketball, Basketball, Tennis, Track racing, Snooker, Futsal, Handball and Table tennis. Grabovica, today have newly formed football club FK Sparta Grabovica which was established in June 2015. This football club does not have its own football stadium, but the settlement council promised to realize that initiative in the periods ahead.

Tourism and culture 
Grabovica has great potential for progress in the area of tourism, thanks to their geographical position and panorama view over Gornji Milanovac and surroundings. Grabovica woods are popular for hunting on venison. The Ždreban peak of Grabovica is also and famous picnic place for 1 May celebration or International Workers' Day, even today. This village has a few privately owned country hotels.

Grabovica has a Youth Culture and information center, currently under reconstruction. The plan is to build a modern center of the village with diversity of information (such as new tourist signs; information service; web page incorporated in Gornji Milanovac tourist organization web site for touristic purposes; hydro-meteorological, daily radiation, information about the concentration of allergens in the air; about road conditions and advice). This cultural center is the main place for gathering like for: organization of voting and referendums, youth parties, culture exposure, humanitarian actions, trading, family register, social-tax evidence and public session of the village citizens. Also in the past on the land of territory of this village was and the House of Serbian-Norwegian friendship. After new internal borders in municipality of Gornji Milanovac, this cultural center become a part of Gornji Milanovac settlement. Also there is mass grave with the monument for the fallen soldiers of the Austro-Hungarian Army and Serbian Royal Army on the same place (from the World War I). On the peak of Ždreban (Engl. Foal) there are ruins of a planned Children Rehabilitation hospital (1950) but investments were insufficient, and there is no planned construction.

Through the winter, spring and summer periods in the areas of Grabovica hamlets, quad bikes tours (ATV tour) are being organized. This automotive sport adventure is more popular among the local population and tourist who visit municipality of Gornji Milanovac.

Also, Grabovica offers to the lovers of night sky great view of the stars (November–February and July–August), clean air and a diversity of ecosystem. In some parts of this village configuration of the terrain offers (in Parac) a panorama view on Gornji Milanovac and surrounding settlements.

Feast of the Ascension is the village patron day. During that celebration people of this village gathers for the launch or barbecue with their other family members and friends. Some residents donate food to the poor population of Gornji Milanovac.

Notable people
Grabovica had/has several notable residents: 
 Milomir Marić, Serbian journalist, writer, and television presenter;

Economy
Many residents depends from Gornji Milanovac industry and economy. Many of them works in the following economic sectors:
 Secondary sector- 106, 
 Primary sector- 35,
 Tertiary sector- 48 and
  Unknown- 4.

Infrastructure
Through this village passes Road 177 and Regional bypass road Gornji Milanovac-Grabovica-Knić-Kragujevac. Also, the major road that is passing through the village, connecting other hamlets of Grabovica and center of municipality Gornji Milanovac and in the same time it is a detour, is marked L-12 (mark "L" stands for "Local road"). The nearest path to the center of the municipality is 6.3 km (3.91 mi). Also turn to state highways E-763 (class Ia) is close by Grabovica. In sense of use civilian airports, nearest one is Morava Airport (local road L18-Lunjevica, Gornja Trepča, interpasses E-763 at Mrčajevci to Ladjevci).     
This village is connected to Water supply network Banjani (local supply) and Rzav (Moravica district regional supplier). Also, Grabovica is interconnected with Gornji Milanovac local supplier JP "Grejanje" of the natural gas network. As for internet infrastructure, residents of this village are connected by ADSL and it is in planned to set up one up steaming receiver for MMDS. On its terrain, Grabovica has one radio-television repeater and all residents are connected to the landline and mobile telephony. Major households in Grabovica are connected to municipality sewerage and waste systems, while in the other parts users are connected on own cesspits which are regularly maintained independently or by waste and water management company JKP Gornji Milanovac.

Gallery

Neighboring settlements with Grabovica
Grabovica is  bordering with:

External links
 Gornji Milanovac Settlement's council pages
 Tourist Organisation of the Municipality of Gornji Milanovac
 Weather forecast for Grabovica-Gornji Milanovac

References

Populated places in Moravica District